R. princeps may refer to:
 Rissoina princeps, a sea snail species
 Roystonea princeps, the Morass cabbage palm or Morass royal palm, a palm species endemic to western Jamaica